In the geometry of hyperbolic 4-space, the order-5 5-cell honeycomb is one of five compact regular space-filling tessellations (or honeycombs). With Schläfli symbol {3,3,3,5}, it has five 5-cells around each face. Its dual is the 120-cell honeycomb, {5,3,3,3}.

Related honeycombs
It is related to the order-5 tesseractic honeycomb, {4,3,3,5}, and order-5 120-cell honeycomb, {5,3,3,5}.

It is topologically similar to the finite 5-orthoplex, {3,3,3,4}, and 5-simplex, {3,3,3,3}.

It is analogous to the 600-cell, {3,3,5}, and icosahedron, {3,5}.

See also 
 List of regular polytopes

References 
Coxeter, Regular Polytopes, 3rd. ed., Dover Publications, 1973. . (Tables I and II: Regular polytopes and honeycombs, pp. 294–296)
Coxeter, The Beauty of Geometry: Twelve Essays, Dover Publications, 1999  (Chapter 10: Regular honeycombs in hyperbolic space, Summary tables II,III,IV,V, p212-213)

Honeycombs (geometry)